Bengoetxea (Basque modern spelling), Bengoechea (or Vengoechea, Spanish spellings) or Bengoetchea (French spelling) is a Basque surname which is common all throughout the Basque Country, especially in cities such as: Murelaga, Lizarza, Alkitza, Aizarna, Aulestia, Igeldo (Donostia, San Sebastian), Oiartzun, Aia, Olaberria, Lazkano, Berrobi (Tolosa) and Zizurkil in Gipuzkoa; Valley of Orozko, Mungia, Zeberio, Mundaka and Galdakao in Biscay; and in Arrieta and Baranbio (Amurrio) in Alava.

Meaning

Derivative of Bengoetxea or Bengoetxe, the name literally means down-more-of-house-the (be-en-go-etxe-a), translated into English as "the house of further down" and translated into Spanish as "la casa de más abajo". It comes from "been" superlative of "be" (inferior part) and "etxe" (house). The Bengoechea coat of arms is: in gold, a tree of sinople (green), and crossed to its trunk, two bulls of sable (black).

Notable Bengoecheas

Arturo Bengochea, former President of the Cuban League of Professional Baseball
Eduardo Bengoechea, Argentine tennis player
Fernando Bengoechea, Argentine photographer
Hernando de Bengoechea, French-Colombian poet
Javier de Bengoechea, Basque poet
Jose Antonio Urrutikoetxea Bengoetxea, Basque member of ETA
Juan Zaragüeta Bengoechea - philosopher and psychologist born in Orio (Guipúzcoa) in 1883
María Verónica Bengoechea, Argentine hockey player
Doctora Mercedes Bengoechea, Spanish linguist, Senior Lecturer in Sociolinguistics, University of Alcalá. Awarded the Distinguished Cross First Class of the Order of San Raimundo de Peñafort by the Minister of Justice. June 24, 2011.
Oinatz Bengoetxea, Bengoetxea VI (born in 1984), Basque pelota champion in 2008
Pablo Bengoechea, Uruguayan footballer
Zenón de Somodevilla y Bengoechea, Marquis of Ensenada, Spanish statesman
The Bengoechea Hotel

References
Buber's Basque Surnames (Bengoechea)
surnames.org 

Basque-language surnames